Estadio Segundo Aranda Torres is a multi-use stadium in Huacho, Peru. It is currently used mostly for football matches and is the home stadium of Total Chalaco of the Peruvian Segunda División and Juventud Barranco of the Copa Perú. The stadium holds 8,000 spectators.

External links
Stadium information
Stadium in 3D gallery

Segundo Aranda Torres
Buildings and structures in Lima Region